Cemilli is a village in Mersin Province, Turkey. It is a part of Mezitli district, which is a second level municipality of Greater Mersin. It is situated on the road connecting Mersin to Fındıkpınarı and to the south of the Taurus Mountains. The population was 216 as of 2012. As of January 2017, the village did not have a hospital or school.

References

Villages in Mezitli District